Richard José Figueroa Avilés (born 4 August 1996 in Puerto la Cruz) or simply Richard Figueroa, is a Venezuelan professional footballer who plays for Deportivo Táchira as an forward.

International career
In June 2021, Figueroa was summoned to the Venezuela national team as one out of 15 'emergency players', after two positive COVID-19 case in the Venezuelan 2021 Copa América squad, while the members of the team had to be isolated.
Currently playing in the most biggest team of Venezuela, Deportivo Táchira.

References

External links
 Richard Figueroa at playmakerstats.com (English version of ogol.com.br)

1996 births
Living people
People from Puerto la Cruz
Venezuelan footballers
Association football forwards
Zulia F.C. players
Deportivo Anzoátegui players
Asociación Civil Deportivo Lara players
Zamora FC players